Nate Lee is an American author and former senior editor at Chicago's Newcity weekly magazine who advocated passionately for live theater. At Newcity, Lee wrote features, a weekly column called Urbanitie, theatre and film reviews as well as stories on architecture and historic preservation, and at one point wrote a book which turned into a musical comedy revue entitled Speak of the Twenties. Working with publishers Brian and Jan Hieggelke, he attracted top writers to write for Newcity including top theater critics who became prominent at other publications later, including Chris Jones of the Chicago Tribune and Rohan Preston of the Minneapolis Star-Tribune. He wrote numerous books published by Abingdon Press and reviews for websites. Lee attended Phillips Academy in Andover and graduated in the school's first co–educational class in 1974.

Publications
 Words From the Cross and 5 Other Dramas for Tweens, by Nate Lee (Paperback) 2010
 What a Story!: And Five Other Dramas for Tweens, by Nate Lee (Paperback) 2007
 Don't Miss the Bus and five Other Dramas for Tweens, by Nate Lee, published by Abingdon Press (2006) 
 I'll Be Right Back And 5 Other Dramas for Tweens, by Nate Lee
 What's The Score: And 5 Other Drams For Teens (Paperback)
 Trouble in the Temple And Five Other Dramas for Tweens (Paperback)
 Sleep On It!: And 5 Other Dramas for Tweens, by Nate Lee (Hardcover), Abingdon Press, (2007) 
 Joy in the Morning: Easy Dramas, Speeches, and Recitations for Children (Paperback)
 Gift of Christmas Presence (Paperback)
 The Invitation: And 5 Other Dramas for Tweens, by Nate Lee

References

Living people
American male non-fiction writers
American theater critics
Christian writers
Writers from Chicago
Phillips Academy alumni
Tulane University alumni
1956 births